The Future of Earthly Delites is a compilation album released by Australian pop duo Savage Garden, released to promote their world tour of the same name. The album includes two discs: one featuring their self-titled debut album "Savage Garden" , and a second featuring several remixes and B-sides. Two versions of the album were released: one in Australia, featuring the original Australian version of the album, containing "Mine" and "All Around Me", and one in Europe, containing the International version of the album, removing "Mine" and "All Around Me", but adding "Promises". Later pressings of the Australian version of the album include an alternate version of the Tears on the Dancefloor Mix of "Tears of Pearls", featuring more reverb on the vocals. The reason for this has not been explained.

Track listing
Savage Garden (Australian version) "To the Moon and Back" – 5:41
 "Carry on Dancing" – 3:45
 "Tears of Pearls" – 3:46
 "I Want You" – 3:52
 "Truly Madly Deeply" (Australian version) – 4:37
 "Violet" – 4:04
 "All Around Me" – 4:11
 "Universe" – 4:20
 "A Thousand Words" – 4:00
 "Break Me Shake Me" – 3:23
 "Mine" – 4:30
 "Santa Monica" – 3:37Savage Garden (European version) "To the Moon and Back" – 5:41
 "I Want You" – 3:52
 "Truly Madly Deeply" (international version) – 4:38
 "Tears of Pearls" – 3:46
 "Universe" – 4:20
 "Carry on Dancing" – 3:45
 "Violet" – 4:04
 "Break Me Shake Me" – 3:23
 "A Thousand Words" – 4:00
 "Promises" – 3:33
 "Santa Monica" – 3:37The Future of Earthly Delites
 "I Want You" (Xenomania Funky Mix) – 4:34
 "Break Me Shake Me" (Broken Mix) – 4:18
 "Santa Monica" (Bittersweet Mix) – 5:00
 "Tears of Pearls" (Tears on the Dancefloor Mix) – 5:24
 "Carry on Dancing" (Ultra Violet Mix) – 6:46
 "All Around Me" (Hardcore Catwalk Mix) – 5:18
 "I Want You" (Getmeouttathisclubmix) – 4:35
 "I Want You" (Xenomania 12" Club Mix) – 7:02
 "To the Moon and Back" (Hani's Num Club Mix) – 9:18
 "To the Moon and Back" (Hani's Num Dub Mix) – 5:15
 "To the Moon and Back" (A Journey Through Space and Time Mix) – 4:39

References

Savage Garden albums
1998 albums
Columbia Records albums